Jade Leung, born 23 November 1969 in Hong Kong as Leung Yuk-yin is a Hong Kong actress known for starring in kung fu and action films.

She received the 1992 Best New Performer Award at the 11th Hong Kong Film Awards for her role in the 1991 film Black Cat.

Filmography
The following is a filmography of Jade Leung's work.

Film
 Black Cat (1991) - Erica Leung/Catherine
 Black Cat 2 (1992) - Catherine
 Satin Steel (1994) - Jade Leung
 Spider Woman (1995) - Kenny/Ken
 Green Hat (1995) - Pearl/Joyce
 Fox Hunter (1995) - Miss Yeung
 Enemy Shadow (1995) - Jade Wong
 Velvet Gloves (1996) - Feng Tin
 Killing Me Hardly (1997) - Sunny
 The Peeping Tom (1997) - Cheng Hsuen
 Raging Angels (1998)
 Leopard Hunting (1998)
 Phantom of Snake (2000)
 Money Laundry (2000)
 Black Cat in Jail (2000)
 Strangers Meet on the Way (2001)
 Could You Kill My Husband Please? (2001)
 U-Man (2002)
 Flying Dragon, Leaping Tiger (2002) - Liu Yun-long
 Brush up My Sisters (2003)
 Black Cat Agent Files (2003)
 The Marksman (2004)
 Kung Fu Tea (2004)
 Kung Fu Mahjong (2005) - Phoenix
 My Wife Can Fight (2006)
 Beautiful 2012 (2012)
 Special Female Force (2016)
 Line Walker (2016)
 The Fatal Raid (2019)

TV series
  Legend of YungChing  (1997)
 Burning Flame (1998)
 A Matter of Customs (2000)
 The Kung Fu Master (2000)
 Battle Against Evil (2002)
 War and Beauty (2004) - Naplan Fuk-ah
 ICAC Investigators 2014 (2014) Episode 5
 Tomorrow Is Another Day (2014) (TV series)
 Tiger Cubs II (2014) Episode 3
 Lady Sour (2014) (TV series)
 Eye in the Sky (2015) (TV series)
 Lord of Shanghai (2015) (TV series)
 Brother's Keeper II'' (2016) (TV series)

References

External links

1969 births
Hong Kong television actresses
Living people
Hong Kong film actresses
20th-century Hong Kong actresses
21st-century Hong Kong actresses